Pål Sundvor (8 September 1920 – 11 November 1992) was a Norwegian journalist, novelist, children's writer, poet and playwright. He was born in Fusa, and made his literary début in 1947 with the children's book Ola frå garden. Among his other works are the novel Fangen er fri from 1960, the poetry collection Loffarens vise from 1962, and the play Kurdarspel from 1978. He was awarded the Gyldendal's Endowment in 1975.

References

1920 births
1992 deaths
People from Fusa
20th-century Norwegian novelists
20th-century Norwegian poets
Norwegian male poets
Norwegian children's writers
Norwegian male novelists
20th-century Norwegian male writers